Acanthoclinus matti is a longfin of the family Plesiopidae, found only in New Zealand at depths down to 17 m. The specific name honours Hardy's son, Matthew.

References

Acanthoclinus
Endemic marine fish of New Zealand
Fish described in 1985